Ludwikowo  is a village in the administrative district of Gmina Dobre, within Radziejów County, Kuyavian-Pomeranian Voivodeship, in north-central Poland.

Statistics 
Population-26
Children-5
Houses-6 (7)

References

Ludwikowo